The Pragser Bach is a stream in South Tyrol, Italy. It flows into the Rienz near Welsberg.

References 
 Information about the Pragser Bach in German and Italian.

Rivers of Italy
Rivers of South Tyrol